Writers With Drinks is a literary event that has run monthly since 2001 in San Francisco, California.  It is a spoken word variety show hosted by Charlie Jane Anders, who MCs and introduces the six readers from six different genres including literary fiction, poetry, stand-up comedy, erotica or porn, science fiction and fantasy, blogging, reporting, memoir, and non-fiction.

Proceeds from the event benefitted the production of Other magazine until 2008; they are now donated to the Center for Sex and Culture. The long-lasting, eclectic and popular series has contributed to defining a generation of San Francisco Bay Area writers and spoken word performers.

Awards

 Best of the Bay Award.  2005, 2006, 2007, 2008.

References

External links 
 Official site

Culture of San Francisco
Literary festivals in the United States
Performance art in California